Yagub Mammadov may refer to:

 Yagub Mammadov (politician), Acting President of Azerbaijan from 6 March to 14 May and from 18 to 19 May 1992.
 Yagub Mammadov (singer), Azerbaijani mugham singer.

See also 
 Mammadov